This national electoral calendar for the year 2002 lists the national/federal direct elections to be held in 2002 in the de jure and de facto sovereign states. By-elections are excluded, though national referendums are included.

January

February

March

April

May
 May 5 – In the second round of the French presidential election, Jacques Chirac is reelected.
 May 15 – Dutch general election, 2002: The CDA has become the largest party and the right-wing LPF became the third largest. This was the beginning of Balkenende I cabinet which collapsed 84 days later.

June

July
 July 27 – The New Zealand Labour Party, is re-elected.

August

September

October
 October 27 – Luiz Inácio Lula da Silva is elected President of Brazil.

November

December
 December 12 – Hans Enoksen is elected prime minister of Greenland.

Unknown

National
Political timelines of the 2000s by year